Shepherdess with her Flock is an 1864 oil-on-canvas painting by Jean-François Millet, now in the Musee d'Orsay in Paris.

History
Millet expressed a desire to paint a work showing a shepherdess with her flock as early as 1862. As his friend Alfred Sensier related, this theme "obsessed the artist's mind" until he exhibited the work at the Paris Salon of 1864, where it was a great success, called a "refined canvas" by some and a "masterpiece" by others. It was particularly esteemed by the middle-classes in Paris, who preferred idealised paintings of rural life to caring about the hard life of real peasants.

References

Paintings by Jean-François Millet
1864 paintings
Paintings in the collection of the Musée d'Orsay
Farming in art
Sheep in art